Berny Thomas Burke Montiel (born 16 March 1996) is a Costa Rican footballer who plays as a right winger for Liga FPD club Sporting San José.

Club career
Burke started his career at hometown club Santos de Guápiles and made his professional debut on 23 April 2014, in a Costa Rican Primera División match against CF Universidad de Costa Rica.

On 30 June 2016, Burke agreed a two-year deal with C.D. Santa Clara.

References

External links

1996 births
Living people
People from Limón Province
Association football midfielders
Costa Rican footballers
Costa Rican expatriate footballers
Santos de Guápiles footballers
C.D. Santa Clara players
C.S. Herediano footballers
Liga Portugal 2 players
Expatriate footballers in Portugal
Costa Rican expatriate sportspeople in Portugal
Costa Rica youth international footballers